Storm over Asia may refer to:
Storm over Asia (1928 film)
Storm over Asia (1938 film)